The 1983 Tripura Legislative Assembly election took place on 1 May 1983, to elect the Members of the Legislative Assembly (MLA) from each of the 60 Assembly constituencies in Tripura, India.

The Communist Party of India (Marxist) (CPI(M)), led by Nripen Chakraborty, won 37 seats and formed the Government in Tripura.

Highlights
Election to the Tripura Legislative Assembly were held on February 15, 1993.  The election were held in a single phase for all the 60 assembly constituencies.

Participating Political Parties

No. of Constituencies

Electors

Performance of Women Candidates

Result

Constituency wise Winners

Government Formation
The Communist Party of India (Marxist) (CPI(M)) won 37 out of 60 seats in the 60-seat Legislative Assembly.  The Indian National Congress (INC) won 12 seats in the Legislative Assembly.  Nripen Chakraborty of the CPI-M formed a government as Chief Minister.

References

State Assembly elections in Tripura
Tripura